Associazione Sportiva Sestese Calcio is an Italian association football club located in Sesto Fiorentino, Tuscany. It currently plays in Eccellenza.

History 
Sestese was founded in 1945

It in the season 2010–11 it was relegated from Serie D group E to Eccellenza Tuscany after playout, but it was readmitted to serie D to fill vacancies.

In the 2011–12 season it was again relegated to Eccellenza.

Colors and badge 
Its colors are blue and red.

Honours
 Coppa Italia Dilettanti
 Winners: 1988–89

External links
 Official homepage

References

Football clubs in Tuscany
Association football clubs established in 1945
1945 establishments in Italy